Southborough, London may refer to:

Southborough, Bromley, England
Southborough, Kingston-upon-Thames, England